Kukety is a rural locality (a village) in Vereshchaginsky District, Perm Krai, Russia. The population was 279 as of 2010. There are 8 streets.

Geography 
Kukety is located 18 km east of Vereshchagino (the district's administrative centre) by road. Krutiki is the nearest rural locality.

References 

Rural localities in Vereshchaginsky District